Cody Husband (born March 19, 1988) is a former professional Canadian football offensive lineman, having played most of his career with the BC Lions of the Canadian Football League (CFL).  He was also a member of the Hamilton Tiger-Cats when he first begun his playing career. He signed as an undrafted free agent with the Tiger-Cats on March 2, 2011. Husband played CIS football for the UBC Thunderbirds.

References

External links
 Canadian Football League profile
 
 

1988 births
Living people
Players of Canadian football from British Columbia
Canadian football offensive linemen
Sportspeople from New Westminster
UBC Thunderbirds football players
BC Lions players
Hamilton Tiger-Cats players